Jakub Kot (born 19 January 1990) is a Polish ski jumper, and a member of the Polish youth ski jumping team.

Personal life 
Kot was born in Limanowa, Poland, but raised in Zakopane. His father Rafał was a physiotherapist for the Polish ski jumping team. Jakub's younger brother Maciej (born 1991) is also a ski jumper. On 22 October 2016 in Zakopane, he married Joanna Pilch. On 17 March 2017 his wife gave birth to their first child, a daughter named Otylia. In September 2018 his second daughter was born.

Career 
He is currently in the youth team of Poland. He debuted in the Continental Cup in the season 2007/2008. He competed at the World Junior Championships 2009 in Štrbské Pleso, where the individual was 20th and won  a bronze medal in the normal hill with Polish team - Maciej Kot, Grzegorz Miętus and Andrzej Zapotoczny.
On 26 March 2013 he won the Polish Championship with the team AZS Zakopane - Krzysztof Miętus, Grzegorz Miętus and his brother Maciej Kot.

References 

1990 births
Living people
Polish male ski jumpers
Universiade medalists in ski jumping
People from Limanowa
Universiade bronze medalists for Poland
Competitors at the 2011 Winter Universiade
Competitors at the 2013 Winter Universiade
Competitors at the 2015 Winter Universiade